Janq'u Qullu (Aymara janq'u white, qullu mountain, "white mountain", also spelled Jankho Kkollu) is a mountain in the Andes of Bolivia which reaches a height of approximately . It is located in the La Paz Department, José Manuel Pando Province, Catacora Municipality. The Janq'u Qullu River which originates southwest of the mountain flows along its slopes.

References 

Mountains of La Paz Department (Bolivia)